Parliamentary elections were held in Yemen on 27 April 1997. The governing General People's Congress of President Ali Abdullah Saleh won a landslide victory, taking 187 of the 301 seats, although several opposition parties including the Yemeni Socialist Party boycotted the election alleging that the government had harassed and arrested their party workers. The main opposition party, al-Islah, attacked the government for not carrying out economic reforms and for corruption. Voter turnout was 61.0%.

Campaign
Of the 16 million people in Yemen about 4.6 million were registered to vote with about a quarter of them being women. However, only about 2.6 million people received their voting cards.

Over 2,300 candidates, from 12 parties, competed for the 301 seats in the House of Representatives. Most candidates were independents, however many of these were backed by either the General People's Congress or al-Islah parties. There were 19 female candidates. Each party or independent candidate had their own logo such as an owl or horse for the ballot paper to help illiterate voters. There were few disagreements over policy between the parties.

Results

Aftermath
In two districts, Hajjah and Dhamar the results were cancelled due to irregularities. International monitors described the elections as being 'reasonably free and fair' and 'a positive step in the democratic development of Yemen'.

After the elections, 39 MPs elected as independents joined the GPC, 10 joined Al-Islah and two joined the Yemeni Socialist Party.

References

External links
Complete list of parties who contested the election Al-Bab
Election report Inter-Parliamentary Union

Elections in Yemen
1997 in Yemen
Yemen
Election and referendum articles with incomplete results